Nožice is a settlement on the right bank of the Kamnik Bistrica River south of Kamnik in the Upper Carniola region of Slovenia. Administratively it belongs to the Municipality of Domžale.

References

External links

Nožice on Geopedia

Populated places in the Municipality of Domžale